Keren Hayesod – United Israel Appeal (literally "The Foundation Fund") is an official fundraising organization for Israel with branches in 45 countries.  Its work is carried out in accordance with the Keren haYesod Law-5716, passed by the Knesset in January 1956, granting the organization a unique fundraising status. It is a registered corporation of the State of Israel.

One of Israel's three “National Institutions,” Keren Hayesod works in coordination with the Government of Israel and the Jewish Agency for Israel to further the national priorities of the State of Israel.

History

Pre-state era

Keren Hayesod was established at the World Zionist Congress in London on July 7–24, 1920 to provide the Zionist movement with resources needed to establish a Jewish homeland in Palestine.  It came in response to the Balfour Declaration of 1917, which  stated that “his Majesty's government views with favour the establishment in Palestine of a national home for the Jewish people” -  turning the ages-old dream of the return to Zion into a politically feasible goal.

Keren Hayesod established fundraising organizations around the world. Early leaders included Chaim Weizmann, Albert Einstein and Ze’ev Jabotinsky.

During the 1920s, Keren Hayesod began to lay the groundwork for a Jewish National Home and helped raise funds to establish the Hebrew University of Jerusalem,  Bank Hapoalim and various physical projects. In 1926, Keren Hayesod relocated its headquarters from London to Jerusalem. With the establishment of the Jewish Agency in 1929, Keren Hayesod became its fundraising arm while continuing its own wide-ranging activities.

The effects of the worldwide economic depression of 1929 hit Keren Hayesod hard, but after Hitler's rise to power in 1933, Keren Hayesod helped to develop the Haifa Bay suburbs to provide housing for German Jews fleeing the Nazis. Towards this end, the Rassco construction company was established in 1934. In 1936, Keren Hayesod supported the establishment of what would become the Israel Philharmonic Orchestra  to provide employment for refugee musicians.

With the help of donations from all over the Jewish world, Keren Hayesod established over 900 urban and rural settlements in Israel, provided housing and jobs for new immigrants. During and after World War II, it launched emergency campaigns, sometimes in partnership with other organizations.  Funds were used to help the Allied war effort and when the concentration camps were liberated to smuggle survivors into Palestine in defiance of British immigration restrictions.

Many Keren Hayesod leaders were murdered in the Holocaust. In March 1948, a car bomb was detonated in the courtyard of the building, killing twelve people, including the director of Keren Hayesod, Leib Yaffe.

State of Israel
The first full decade that followed the birth of the State of Israel was marked by huge waves of immigration, primarily from North Africa, Yemen, Kurdistan and Iraq. Within a few years, Israel's population tripled, resulting in great distress and a heightened demand for social, educational and cultural services. Keren HayesodSderot (1951) and Eilat (1956), as well as kibbutzim and moshavim. Keren Hayesod provided major funding for these communities, establishing new fundraising campaigns around the world and renewing its presence in Germany (1955).

The economic crisis that hit Israel in 1983 and 1984 created major hardships, and programs to alleviate social distress became Keren Hayesod's major priority.  Keren Hayesod-supported Operation Moses brought 5,000 new immigrants from Ethiopia to Israel in a dramatic airlift (1984), and the organization immediately mobilized to raise funds to address the new immigrants’ special needs.
Israel was still in the throes of the First Intifada (1987-1993) when the Soviet Union imploded. The end of the Communist regime in the USSR (1991) opened the gates to over a million Jews who had been fighting for years for the right to immigrate to their ancestral homeland.  In addition, over 14,000 Ethiopian Jews were airlifted to Israel in Operation Solomon (in 1991).  
The massive numbers of new immigrants created a huge demand for immigrant services, housing, and jobs;  Keren Hayesod launched a special Exodus Campaign to fund this effort.
 
The wave of terror launched by the Second Intifada (2000-2004) had a devastating impact on the Israeli economy, resulting in major social distress. The situation was exacerbated by the crisis in the tourism industry and the bursting of the hi-tech bubble. In response, Keren Hayesod traditional areas of activity, immigrant absorption and Jewish-Zionist education in the Diaspora. Thus, for example, Keren Hayesod, in partnership with the Jewish Agency, Cisco Systems Inc. and the Appleseeds Academy, initiated the Net@ project, which provides hi-tech training to youth in the suburbs.  Keren Hayesod was also a lead partner in the Jewish Agency Fund for Victims of Terror.

Tens of thousands disadvantaged children and adults are served by social and cultural programs established by Keren Hayesod. The organization also provides financial support to educational youth villages,  after-school programming, and youth mentoring projects.  Sheltered housing has been constructed to enable Holocaust survivors and the needy elderly live out their lives in dignity and comfort.

Keren Hayesod marked its 90th anniversary in 2010. A major priority is now financial aid to peripheral cities in Israel and programs to bridge the social gap.

Social aid programs
Hundreds of student volunteers from the Ayalim movement have carried out social, cultural, educational and infrastructure projects to better the lives of 20,000 adults and children in the Negev and Galilee.  
The  Youth Futures mentoring program has provided personalized attention, positive social experiences and educational enrichment for 11,000 at-risk youth, primarily from the periphery. 
The Amigour network of sheltered homes has enabled 7,500 low-income elderly individuals, the majority of them immigrants from the former Soviet Union and Holocaust survivors, to enjoy lives of dignity and independence in a comfortable and secure environment. 
Four educational youth villages provided a home for 1,000 severely disadvantaged youngsters, enabling them to break out of the cycle of poverty and obtain skills for a better future.  
The Net@ after-school training project has provided 1,000 at-risk youth in suburban areas advanced technological skills along with tools for social and economic mobility.
240 new olim ages 16½-22 took part in the ten-month Selah-Mir higher education preparatory course in partnership with academic institutions.  
The Yesodot after-school enrichment program at absorption centers has helped 2,000 Ethiopian children integrate in  Israeli society. 
The WINGS program has provided support to 700 lone soldiers, helping them transition into civilian society at the conclusion of their service.

Zionist education in the Diaspora
Jewish summer camps in former Soviet republics have helped to cultivate Jewish and Zionist identity in 6,400 youngsters.  
25,000 Jews in the FSU have studied at Hebrew language ulpan and cultural events.        
The Masa Israel Journey has provided 10,000 young Jewish adults, including 1,456 from the FSU, with the opportunity to study, volunteer or intern in Israel.  
The ten-day Taglit-Birthright experience in Israel has impacted on the lives of 30,000 young Jews from 64 countries.      
The Nativ Jewish education program has deepened the connection to Israel and Judaism among 1,800 new immigrant soldiers.
1,000 high school students from disadvantaged communities have taken part in Net@, an intensive hi-tech and technician course that trains students of all scholastic levels for careers in hi-tech.

Emergency campaigns
Keren haYesod donors provided assistance to the residents of southern Israel who were under daily rocket attack in the summer of 2014. 
    
Following the kidnapping and murder of three teenage boys by Hamas in early June, rocket fire from Gaza intensified into round-the-clock attacks with only 15 seconds to run for safety until the missiles exploded. Keren Hayesod financed the construction of portable bomb shelters which were strategically placed in residential areas, offering refuge to thousands of people. These shelters were purchased with funds collected in Keren Hayesod's Emergency Solidarity Campaign launched after Operation “Protective Edge.” Funds were also used to provide fun days for children, giving them a break from the rocket fire, and for professional counseling for traumatized residents.  Medical equipment was acquired for hospitals in the south where injured soldiers and civilians were brought for treatment.  Other support included financial assistance to families of fallen soldiers and civilians killed in terror attacks, as well as injured soldiers and families whose homes were destroyed by rockets.

References

External links

 
 UIA – United Israel Appeal, in Australia
 A Collection of Keren haYesod historical posters
The Central Zionist Archives in Jerusalem: Collections of Keren haYesod since its foundation.
 

Zionist organizations
Jewish community organizations
International Jewish organizations
Jewish Agency for Israel
Organizations established in 1920